The Journal of Scholarly Publishing is a quarterly peer-reviewed academic journal publishing research and resources for publishers, editors, authors, and marketers in the academic publishing industry, focusing on technological changes, funding, and issues affecting scholarly publishing. It is published by the University of Toronto Press four times a year.

Abstracting and indexing
The journal is abstracted and indexed in:
 Academic Search Alumni Edition
 Academic Search
 Applied Science & Technology Source
 Arts & Humanities Citation Index
 Book Review Digest Plus
 China Education Publications Import & Export Corporation (CEPIEC)
 Communication Abstracts * Computers & Applied Sciences Complete
 Cultures, Langues, Textes: La revue de sommaires
 Current Contents—Arts and Humanities
 Current Contents—Social & Behavioral Sciences
 EJS EBSCO Electronic Journals Service
 Information Science and Technology Abstracts
 JCR: Social Science Edition
 LISA: Library and Information Science Abstracts
 Library, Information Science & Technology Abstracts
 Library Literature & Information Science Index
 Microsoft Academic Search
 MLA International Bibliography
 Project MUSE
 Scopus
 Social Sciences Citation Index

References

External links

University of Toronto Press academic journals
Quarterly journals
Publications established in 1969
English-language journals